Gedalyahu "Gaza" Fuchs  was a Romanian-Jewish footballer and manager. He was the first captain of the Mandatory Palestine national football team, the forerunner of the Israel national football team.

Biography
Fuchs was born in Transylvania and joined a local Jewish football club Shimshon at the age of 15. At the age of 18, after his family disowned him for his fascination with football, Fuchs moved to Chernivtsi, where he played for the local Hakoah club. In 1931 Fuchs immigrated to Palestine and joined Hapoel Haifa, where he played until his retirement in 1947, with his final match played against visiting MTK Budapest. Fuchs was part of the team that reached the 1932 Palestine Cup final, which was abandoned as Hapoel Haifa left the pitch in protest over the referee's decision to award their opponents, British Police a penalty kick.

Fuchs was part of the national team squad for the 1934 World Cup and 1938 World Cup qualification tournaments, playing four matches and captaining the team.

After retiring, Fuchs joined the board of Hapoel Haifa and coached the team's youth team and senior team.

References

External links
 

1911 births
1966 deaths
People from Vâlcea County
20th-century Israeli Jews
Jewish Romanian sportspeople
Romanian footballers
Romanian emigrants to Mandatory Palestine
Hapoel Haifa F.C. players
Israeli football managers
Hapoel Haifa F.C. managers
Association football midfielders
Israel international footballers
Israeli footballers